The 1934 Turkish Football Championship was the fifth edition of the competition. It was held in October. Beşiktaş won their first national championship title by defeating Altay 3–1 in the final after overtime. For Altay it was the club's first appearance in the championship final, with one more to follow in 1951.

The various regional champions competed in a group stage of five groups of three to six teams each, with the group winners advancing to the Final Phase.

Group stage

Antalya Group

Round 1

 1 Result not available. Isparta won the match and advanced to the group final.

Group final

 Isparta won the group and qualified for the final stage.

Istanbul Group

Round 1

Semi-final

 Bursa San'atkâran received a bye for the group final.

Group final

 Beşiktaş won the group and qualified for the final stage.

Konya Group

Round 1

 1 Declared void as Konya İdman Yurdu fielded a player without license. Afyon Spor were awarded the win.

Semi-final

 2 The licenses of Kütahya did not arrive in time. Çankaya were awarded the win and qualified for the group final.
 Afyon Spor received a bye for the group final.

Group final

 Çankaya won the group and qualified for the final stage.

Samsun Group

Round 1

Group final

 1 Trabzon İdman Ocağı did not show up at overtime. Samsun İdman Yurdu were awarded the win and qualified for the final stage.

Uşak Group

Round 1

Group final

 Altay won the group and qualified for the final stage.

Final stage

Round 1

 Samsun İdman Yurdu received a bye for the semi-final.

Semi-final

 Altay received a bye for the final.

Final

References

External links
RSSSF

Turkish Football Championship seasons
Turkish
Turkey